Daniel Alejandro Ibáñez (born 29 March 1995) is an Argentine professional footballer who plays as a midfielder for Argentino de Quilmes.

Club career
Ibáñez's career began with Argentine Primera División side San Lorenzo. They loaned him out in August 2016 to Chacarita Juniors of Primera B Nacional, where he made a total of thirty-four appearances in the 2016–17 season which ended with promotion to the Primera División. He returned to San Lorenzo in July 2017, but departed the club permanently six months later to join fellow top-flight outfit Olimpo. His debut for Olimpo came against River Plate on 3 February 2018. Ibáñez was released on 26 December. In February 2019, Ibáñez was signed by Ascenso MX team Cafetaleros de Tapachula.

In July 2019, Ibáñez went back to his homeland with Primera B Nacional's All Boys. Six months later, after eight appearances, Ibáñez was loaned to Primera B Metropolitana with Los Andes.

International career
Ibáñez was selected in the final squad by Humberto Grondona for the 2015 FIFA U-20 World Cup in New Zealand. However, he was an unused substitute for all three of Argentina's matches as they were eliminated at the group stage.

Career statistics
.

References

External links

1995 births
Living people
People from La Matanza Partido
Argentine footballers
Argentina youth international footballers
Argentina under-20 international footballers
Association football midfielders
Argentine expatriate footballers
Expatriate footballers in Mexico
Argentine expatriate sportspeople in Mexico
Argentine Primera División players
Primera Nacional players
Ascenso MX players
Primera B Metropolitana players
San Lorenzo de Almagro footballers
Chacarita Juniors footballers
Olimpo footballers
Cafetaleros de Chiapas footballers
All Boys footballers
Club Atlético Los Andes footballers
Cañuelas footballers
Sarmiento de Resistencia footballers
Argentino de Quilmes players
Sportspeople from Buenos Aires Province